John Rogers Edelman (born July 27, 1935, in Philadelphia) is an American former Major League Baseball pitcher. Edelman signed with the Milwaukee Braves as a bonus baby free agent in 1955 and played with the team that year.

Edelman played at the collegiate level at West Chester University.

References

1935 births
Living people
Milwaukee Braves players
Major League Baseball pitchers
West Chester Golden Rams baseball players
Baseball players from Philadelphia